Neuropeptide S (NPS) is a neuropeptide found in human and mammalian brain, mainly produced by neurons in the amygdala and between Barrington's nucleus and the locus coeruleus, although NPS-responsive neurons extend projections into many other brain areas. NPS binds specifically to a G protein-coupled receptor, NPSR. Animal studies show that NPS suppresses anxiety and appetite, induces wakefulness and hyperactivity, including hyper-sexuality, and plays a significant role in the extinction of conditioned fear. It has also been shown to significantly enhance dopamine activity in the mesolimbic pathway, and inhibits motility and increases permeability in neurocrine fashion acting through NO in the myenteric plexus in rats and humans.

Synthetic ligands 

The non-peptide NPS receptor antagonist SHA-68 blocks the effects of NPS in animals and is anxiogenic. Several peptide derived NPS agonists and antagonists have also been developed.

Peptide sequence 

Below are the sequences of mature neuropeptide S in several representative species in which it is expressed:

According to Pfam's HMM logo, there is a conserved "KR" cleave site immediately N-terminal to the C-terminal mature peptide.

References

Neuropeptides